The year 1942 in archaeology involved some significant events.

Excavations

Publications
 V. Gordon Childe - What Happened in History.

Finds
January: Mildenhall Treasure discovered by ploughman Gordon Butcher in Suffolk, England.
A hoard of La Tène metalwork is found during the building of a military airfield in Llyn Cerrig Bach on Anglesey.
Rockbourne Roman Villa discovered by a local farmer in Rockbourne, England.

Births
 30 October - Linda Schele, Mayanist (died 1998)

Deaths
 July 28: William Matthew Flinders Petrie, Egyptologist (born 1853)

References

Archaeology
Archaeology
Archaeology by year